Ingvild Landvik Isaksen (born 10 February 1989) is a Norwegian former footballer. She made her debut for the Norway women's national football team in 2009 and represented her country at the 2009 and 2013 editions of the UEFA Women's Championship.

Club career

In November 2013, Isaksen left Kolbotn after eight seasons to join champions Stabæk on a two-year contract. She had been club captain at Kolbotn, but wanted a new challenge. Later on, she played for Juventus, but she suffered serious knee injuries which forced her to leave the club after the season 2017–18. On 21 February 2019, Isaksen announced her retirement from football.

International career

Isaksen made her senior national team debut in January 2009, in a 5–1 friendly defeat by Sweden in Marbella. At UEFA Women's Euro 2009 she was part of Norway's squad and made two substitute appearances, totalling 18 minutes. She played mostly as a winger for Norway and had drifted out of favour, until being brought back and given a more central midfield role by new coach Even Pellerud.

She was called up to be part of the national team for UEFA Women's Euro 2013. She scored her first goal for Norway in a 1–0 victory against Germany in Euro 2013, the Germans' first loss in a UEFA Women's Championship match since 1993. Isaksen performed well and started every match except the final where she was benched to accommodate Cathrine Dekkerhus. Isaksen came in as a substitute in the final where Norway missed two penalty kicks and lost 1–0.

International goals

References

External links
 
 
 Norwegian National Team profile 
 Stabæk Club Profile 
 Profile at fussballtransfers.com 
 Profile at soccerdonna.de 
 
 
 

1989 births
Living people
Norwegian women's footballers
Norway women's international footballers
Toppserien players
Kolbotn Fotball players
Stabæk Fotball Kvinner players
Sportspeople from Fredrikstad
Serie A (women's football) players
Juventus F.C. (women) players
Norwegian expatriate women's footballers
Norwegian expatriate sportspeople in Italy
Expatriate women's footballers in Italy
Women's association football midfielders
UEFA Women's Euro 2017 players